Avianca Costa Rica S.A., formerly known as LACSA (Spanish: Lineas Aéreas Costarricenses S.A.), minority owned by the Synergy Group, is the national airline of Costa Rica and is based in San José. It operates international scheduled services to over 35 destinations in Central, North and South America. The airline previously used the TACA/LACSA moniker when it was a subsidiary of Grupo TACA. Since May 2013, following Avianca's purchase of Grupo TACA, Avianca Costa Rica became one of seven nationally branded airlines (Avianca Ecuador, Avianca El Salvador, etc.) operated by Avianca Group of Latin American airlines.

History

LACSA was formed in October 17, 1945, with the help of Pan American World Airways, and started operations in June 1, 1946, using Douglas DC-3s for local services within Costa Rica, operating as an affiliate of Pan Am. The airline was designated as Costa Rica's Flag carrier in 1949 and was nationalized in 1958.

LACSA operated the Douglas DC-6B four-engined piston airliner from 1960 until 1976 on their regular passenger, and eventually freight, scheduled flights to Miami International Airport. The airline introduced the first of their BAC One-Eleven twin-engined jet airliners onto their Caribbean passenger route network in April 1967.

The airline also operated a subsidiary in the Cayman Islands, Cayman Brac Airways (CBA) Ltd., which it sold a 51% controlling interest in the late 1960s to the Cayman Islands government which in turn used the air carrier to form Cayman Airways.  LACSA served Grand Cayman for many years as an intermediate stop on its services between San José, Costa Rica and Miami.

Beginning 1998, TACA/LACSA was one of the member airlines comprising the TACA Airlines alliance along with Aviateca of Guatemala, Nica of Nicaragua, Isleña of Honduras, and five other regional airlines. In 2008, a new fleet of Embraer 190 jets was introduced.
Also in 2008 a new TACA logo was introduced, followed by a new fleet of Embraer 190 airplanes registered in Costa Rica and operated under the LACSA code. In 2009, Aerovías del Continente Americano S.A. (Avianca) and TACA announced their merger plans to be completed in 2010. By 2013, the airlines began operating as a single commercial brand using the Avianca name.

Destinations

LACSA international destinations in 1973

 

According to the May 31, 1973 LACSA system timetable, the airline was serving the following international destinations:

Barranquilla, Colombia
Caracas, Venezuela
Grand Cayman, Cayman Islands
Maracaibo, Venezuela
Mexico City, Mexico
Miami, Florida
Panama City, Panama
San Andres Island, Colombia
San José, Costa Rica - Hub and airline headquarters
San Salvador, El Salvador

This same timetable states that all international flights were being operated with British Aircraft Corporation BAC One-Eleven twin jets at this time with the exception of the San José-San Andres Island route which was being flown with a Convair 440 propliner.

International routes in 1984
The airline was operating to such international destinations in 1984 as:
Barranquilla, Colombia
Cancun, Mexico
Caracas, Venezuela
Guatemala City, Guatemala
Guayaquil, Ecuador
Los Angeles, USA
Maracaibo, Venezuela
Mexico City, Mexico
Miami, USA
New Orleans, USA
Panama City, Panama
Quito, Ecuador
Rio de Janeiro, Brazil
San Juan, Puerto Rico
San Salvador, El Salvador

These cities were flown to using LACSA’s Boeing 727.

Fleet

Current

As of February 2023, Avianca Costa Rica consists of the following aircraft:

Former
LACSA operated the following aircraft:

Accidents and incidents
On May 23, 1988, a leased Boeing 727-100 (registered TI-LRC), operating the route San José-Managua-Miami, collided with a fence at the end of the runway in the Juan Santamaría International Airport, crashed at a nearby field next to a highway, and caught fire. The excess of weight in the front part of the airplane was the cause of the accident. There were no fatalities out of the 23 occupants.
On 11 January 1998, LACSA flight 691, an Airbus A320-200, veered off a runway at San Francisco International Airport during the takeoff roll. The aircraft left the runway at full speed, coming to rest in a field of mud. The runway was closed after the incident, reducing take-off capacity by 50 percent, leading to massive delays at the airport. None of the 122 passengers on board the aircraft sustained injuries, and stayed at a hotel until another aircraft could transport them to their destination, San José, Costa Rica. The cause of the incident was not determined.

See also
List of airlines of Costa Rica

References

Citations

Bibliography

External links

TACA Official website
From LACSA to TACA to Avianca, 28 May 2013

Airlines established in 1945
Airlines of Costa Rica
Avianca
Grupo TACA